Janez Kajzer (born 21 January 1938) is a Slovene writer, journalist, translator and editor.

Biography 
Kajzer was born in Vižmarje in Ljubljana in 1938. After finishing secondary school he found employment as a journalist at Mladina and Delo and later as an editor at the Borec and Prešernova Družba publishing houses. He has published a number of novels and collections of short stories.

He won the Levstik Award in 1960 for his first published work, the collection of short stories Mimo dnevnega načrta (Beyond the Daily Plan).

Published works 
Mimo dnevnega načrta (Beyond the Daily Plan), short stories, 1960
Klub v črnem (The Club in Black), novel, 1964
Macesen (The Larch), novel about Ivan Grohar, 1978
Prava moška družba (Real Male Company), short stories, 1979
Štirje srčni možje (Four Heary Men), the story of the first ascent of Triglav, 1980
S tramovi podprto mesto (A Town Held Up By Beams), cultural-historical stories, 1983
Obljubljeni kraj (The Promised Land), Portraits of Slovene emigrees to the US, 1984
Samorastnik izpod Blegoša (The Self-Made Mad from Under Mount Blegoš), 1998
Sanjska hiša (Dream House), novel, 2004 
Skrivno oko (The Hidden Eye), short stories, 2005
Perpetuum mobile (Perpetuum mobile), short stories, 2007
V temnih, nemirnih nočeh (In Dark Restless Nights), short stories, 2009
Ovadba opolnoči (Midnight Charge), novel, 2011

References

Slovenian writers
Slovenian journalists
Slovenian editors
Living people
1938 births
Levstik Award laureates
People from the City Municipality of Ljubljana